Hallettsville is a city in Lavaca County, Texas, United States. Its population was 2,731 at the 2020 census. It is the county seat of Lavaca County. Hallettsville also has a sizable German-Texan population as the towns founders were mainly German and Czech immigrants.

History
Hallettsville is named after an early founding family that colonized this area. John Hallett had received a land grant from Stephen F. Austin in 1831, and after his death in 1836, his wife, Margaret Hallett, donated the land for the town's location.

A few of the early settlers of the Hallettsville area include Collatinus Ballard, M. B. Bennett, A. W. Hicks, David Ives, Ira McDaniel, and William Smeathers.

Geography
It is also located midway between the major cities of Houston and San Antonio.

Climate
The climate in this area is characterized by hot, humid summers and generally mild to cool winters.  According to the Köppen climate classification, Hallettsville has a humid subtropical climate, Cfa on climate maps.

Demographics

As of the 2020 United States census, 2,731 people, 984 households, and 551 families were residing in the city.

As of the census of 2000, 2,345 people, 1,019 households, and 627 families resided in the city. The population density was 1,051.0 people per square mile (406.0/km2). The 1,223 housing units had an average density of 548.1 per square mile (211.8/km2). The racial makeup of the city was 77.10% White, 16.46% Black, 0.17% Native American, 0.17% Asian, 4.48% from other races, and 1.62% from two or more races. Hispanics or Latinos of any race were 11.17% of the population.

Of the 1,019 households, 29.9% had children under 18 living with them, 44.0% were married couples living together, 14.6% had a female householder with no husband present, and 38.4% were not families. About 35.6% of all households were made up of individuals, and 21.3% had someone living alone who was 65 or older. The average household size was 2.29 and the average family size was 3.00.

In the city, the population was spread out, with 25.2% under the age of 18, 8.5% from 18 to 24, 23.4% from 25 to 44, 22.4% from 45 to 64, and 20.5% who were 65 years of age or older. The median age was 40 years. For every 100 females, there were 83.1 males. For every 100 females age 18 and over, there were 78.3 males.

The median income for a household in the city was $25,089, and for a family was $38,080. Males had a median income of $31,250 versus $20,365 for females. The per capita income for the city was $14,811. About 16.4% of families and 17.4% of the population were below the poverty line, including 21.0% of those under 18 and 14.5% of those 65 or over.

Arts and culture

Hallettsville is a center of the traditional domino game Texas 42. It is home to the Texas Championship Domino Hall of Fame and also hosts a state-championship tournament every year in January, and a state-championship Texas 42 domino tournament in March.

Hallettsville also has the Central Texas Semipro Baseball Hall of Fame and the Texas State Championship High School Rodeo Hall of Fame. It also hosts its annual Kolache Fest the last weekend in September and State Championship Fiddler's Frolic on the last Saturday in April

The Friench Simpson Memorial Library has served the residents of Hallettsville and Lavaca County for over 70 years. The modern library houses over 20,000 volumes and is a major source of local history and genealogy research for the area. Public-access computers with Internet connections are available for use at the library.

Education

Public education in the city of Hallettsville is provided by the Hallettsville Independent School District. Sacred Heart Catholic School, a private prekindergarten–grade 12 campus, is also located in the city.

Media
 Hallettsville Tribune-Herald

Notable people

 Logan Ondrusek, pitcher for the Cincinnati Reds
 Andy Rice, American college and professional football player
 Cole Wick, American college and professional football player

In popular culture

Although the actual town involved in the real story of the "Chicken Ranch" is located a few miles north of Hallettsville on Highway 77, film makers chose the town's historic Lavaca County Courthouse square to serve as backdrop for the city scenes in The Best Little Whorehouse in Texas, the 1982 musical starring Burt Reynolds and Dolly Parton.

Hallettsville is also the featured location in the 2009 horror film titled Hallettsville, which stars Gary Busey and Derek Lee Nixon.

The town is mentioned in the Robert Earl Keen song "Armadillo Jackel" as the place where they pay $2.50 for dead armadillos.

Ripley's Believe It or Not! once called Hallettsville the "13 City" because in 1913 it had 13 letters in the name, a population of 1300, 13 churches, 13 newspapers, and even 13 saloons.

The town is also visited by Antoine de Maximy for the French TV show J'irais dormir chez vous (in English I'll Come Sleep in Your House), during his journey in the United States.

Notes

References

External links

 

Cities in Lavaca County, Texas
Cities in Texas
County seats in Texas
Czech-American culture in Texas